Jabłonna  is a village in Lublin County, Lublin Voivodeship, in eastern Poland. It is the seat of the gmina (administrative district) called Gmina Jabłonna.

The village has a population of 2,041.

Notable residents
Władysław Taczanowski (1819–1890), zoologist

References

Villages in Lublin County